The 2013–14 Ohio Bobcats women's basketball team represented Ohio University during the 2013–14 NCAA Division I women's basketball season. The Bobcats, led by first year head coach Bob Boldon, played their home games at the Convocation Center in Athens, Ohio as a member of the Mid-American Conference. They finished the season 9–21 and 4–14 in MAC play.

Preseason
The preseason coaches' poll and league awards were announced by the league office on October 29, 2013. Ohio was picked fifth in the MAC East.

Preseason women's basketball coaches poll
(First place votes in parenthesis)

East Division
  (9)
  (3)
 
 
 Ohio

West Division
  (12)

Tournament champs
Central Michigan (9), Akron (1), Bowling Green (1), Miami (1)

Schedule

|-
!colspan=9 style=| Non-conference regular season

|-
!colspan=9 style=| MAC regular season

|-
!colspan=9 style=| MAC Tournament

Awards and honors

All-MAC Awards

See also
2013–14 Ohio Bobcats men's basketball team

References

Ohio
Ohio Bobcats women's basketball seasons
Ohio Bobcats women's basketball
Ohio Bobcats women's basketball